Ludvig Oskar (5 January 1874 in Kuusalu, Estonia — 1 June 1951 in Varel, Germany) was an Estonian painter.

He started his art studies in 1903, while artist Ants Laikmaa opened his studio school. In addition to studio classes Oskar took watercolor classes with Karl Winkler.
After studies abroad he taught at Tallinna Reaalkool (Science High School of Tallinn). Among his students was Evald Okas.

In 1926 he decided to fix Pika Jala Väravatorn (the gate tower named Long Leg at the medieval city wall of Tallinn). For this purpose he took a bank loan of half a million cents (5,000 Estonian kroons) and reconstructed the tower. Oskar demolished the old mantel chimney and built to each floor ovens and stoves.

References

External links
 Art Museum of Estonia

1874 births
1951 deaths
People from Kuusalu Parish
People from Kreis Harrien
20th-century Estonian painters
20th-century Estonian male artists
Estonian World War II refugees
Estonian emigrants to Germany